Leptotes socotranus is a butterfly in the family Lycaenidae. It is found on Socotra in the Arabian Sea.

References

Butterflies described in 1899
Leptotes (butterfly)
Endemic fauna of Socotra